Laar is a hamlet in the Dutch province of Limburg. It is located in the municipality of Peel en Maas, 2 km southwest of the town of Maasbree itself.

Laar is not a statistical entity, and the postal authorities have placed it under Maasbree. Laar has no place name signs, and consists of about 10 houses.

References

Populated places in Limburg (Netherlands)
Peel en Maas